Muhammad Izuan Bin Salahuddin (born 31 October 1991) is a Malaysian footballer who plays as a winger.

Club career
Izuan started his career with Kelantan's President Cup Team in year 2009 for two years. Then, he was promoted into senior team by Kelantan coach, B. Sathianathan in the 2011 season.

On the next season, he was loaned to Harimau Muda A to competing in the S. League. However, he failed to enter first team squad.

For the 2013 seasons, he was recalled by Bojan Hodak for Kelantan's senior team.

He was released by Kelantan in 2014 and joined Sime Darby.

In 2015, he joined Sabah competing in the 2015 Malaysia Premier League.

After a season with Sabah in Malaysia Premier League, he moved to the upper league club, PDRM for 2016 Malaysia Super League.

References

External links
 

1991 births
Living people
Malaysian footballers
Kelantan FA players
Negeri Sembilan FA players
PDRM FA players
Sabah F.C. (Malaysia) players
People from Kota Bharu
People from Kelantan
Malaysian people of Malay descent
Association football wingers